The following is a list of bridges over the River Torridge in Devon listed going upstream (south) from the estuary at Bideford. The left bank of a river is that on the left of a traveller progressing downstream.

References

Sources

Torridge
Torridge
Torridge